Pseudorasbora interrupta is a species of cyprinid fish endemic to streams on Fenghuang Mountain in Guangdong, China.

References

Pseudorasbora
Fish described in 2007